John Rochfort was a member of the pre-1801 Parliament of Ireland, in the Irish House of Commons. He was born in 1692 the second son of Robert Rochfort and his wife Hannah Hannock, he married Deborah Staunton in 1722 and they had two sons Robert and John. 
John Rochfort lived in Cloughgrean, Co, Carlow, and Newpark, Co. Dublin.
Rochfort served in the Irish Parliament for Ballyshannon, Co. Donegal from 1713 to 1714 and from 1715 to 1727 and for Mullingar, Co. Westmeath from 1727 to 1760.
Rochfort died on January 30, 1771.

A number of Rochforts family served in the Irish House of Commons for constituencies in Westmeath, his father Robert Rochfort who served as Speaker of the House, his brother George Rochfort and his Grandfather William Hannock.

References

1692 births
1771 deaths
Members of the Parliament of Ireland (pre-1801) for County Donegal constituencies
Irish MPs 1727–1760
Members of the Parliament of Ireland (pre-1801) for County Westmeath constituencies